The Kings Royal is a major sprint car racing event held annually at Eldora Speedway near New Weston, Ohio, United States. Regarded as one of the world's most prestigious sprint car races, it awarded a $175,000 USD winner's prize since 2019.

History

First run in 1984, the Kings Royal saw Eldora Speedway promoter Earl Baltes offering $50,000 to the winner of a 40-lap event. Steve Kinser won the inaugural race, which sees the winner seated on a throne in victory lane while adorned with a crown and robe and carrying a scepter. Kinser leads all drivers with seven Kings Royal victories.

The event is considered to be one of the most prestigious sprint car events held worldwide, and is considered to be a "Crown Jewel" event. From its inaugural running through 2018, there was a standard $50,000 winner's purse; the 2019 running saw a boost to $175,000 for the winner's prize. The Kings Royal is Eldora's largest event each season, drawing over 30,000 spectators.

In 2014, Kerry Madsen became the first Australian to win the Kings Royal. Beginning in 2016, a preliminary full feature, the "Joker's Wild", was held on the Thursday before the Saturday Kings Royal; on the Friday of race week an additional event, "The Knight Before the Kings Royal", is held. No driver won back-to-back Kings Royals for the first 33 years of the event, until Donny Schatz did so in 2017; in 2018 Schatz won again to become the first driver to win three Kings Royals in a row.

The event lost its annual status after the 2020 event was canceled because of the global pandemic. In 2021, the Kings Royal was run as a double feature. The night before the Thursday feature was the Joker's Wild event. The Thursday event was the first feature (new ticket). The Friday event was the Knight Before event. The Saturday event was the second feature. Because of weather issues, the two features were run on the same Saturday, with the Thursday feature running in the afternoon and the Saturday feature running in the evening. The Knight Before was run on Sunday.

The 2021 event saw the start of a nine-year sanctioning agreement with World Racing Group, promoters of the World of Outlaws Sprint Car Series.

For 2022, the event will retain its four-day format. The calendar calls for the Joker's Wild on Wednesday, Historical Big One on Thursday, Knight Before on Friday, and the 39th Kings Royal on Saturday.

Winners

References

External links

1984 establishments in Ohio
July sporting events
Sprint car racing
Recurring sporting events established in 1984
World of Outlaws
Saturday events